The Girls' javelin throw at the 2013 World Youth Championships in Athletics was held on 10 and 11 July.

Medalists

Records 
Prior to the competition, the following records were as follows.

Final 
Final rule: Top 8 after 3 rounds continue competition for rounds 4-6.

Qualification 
Qualification rule: 51.00 (Q) or at least 12 best performers (q) qualified.

Group A

Group B

References 

2013 World Youth Championships in Athletics